= Moses O.K =

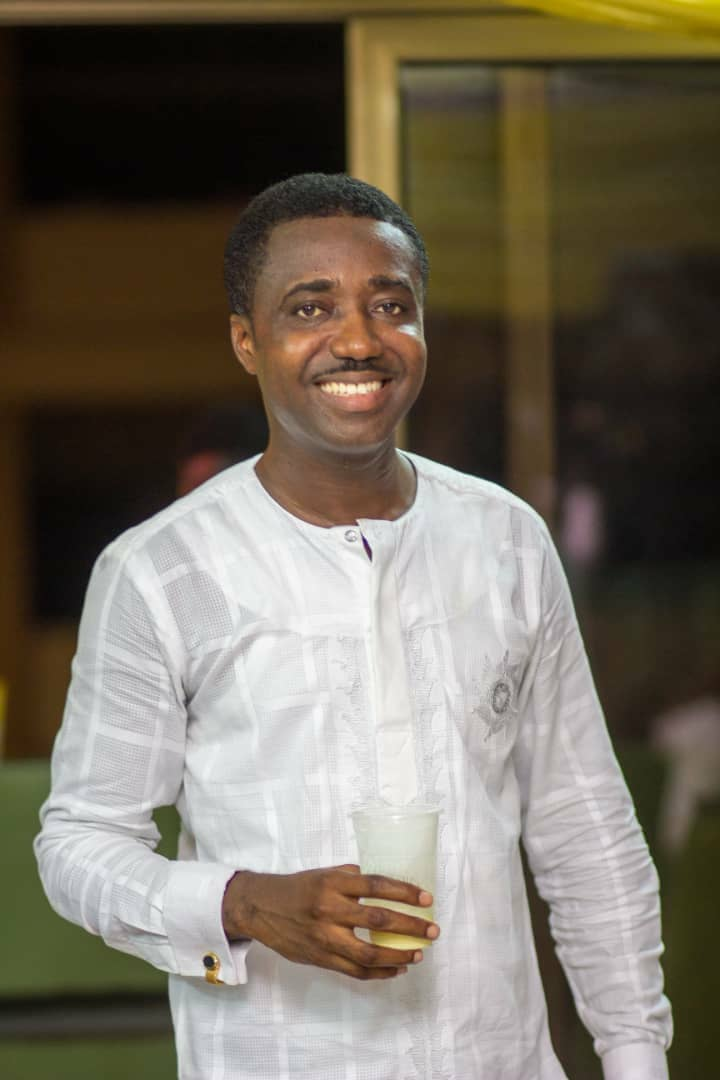
- Moses O.K in 2019

Background information
- Born: Moses Osei Kwarteng; Kumasi, Ghana
- Genre: Gospel
- Occupations: Musician, songwriter, preacher
- Instrument: Vocals
- Years active: 2003–present

Moses Osei Kwarteng better known as Moses OK, is a Ghanaian Gospel musician, songwriter and an author.

== Awards and nominations ==
Moses OK was nominated for best male vocal performance and New gospel artist of the year 2013. In October 2023, he was active in releasing and promoting music, including his singles “Ene Me Nko” and “Asesa”.
